Hamilton Township is a township in Decatur County, Iowa, USA.  As of the 2000 census, its population was 180.

History
Hamilton Township was created in 1850. It is named for county commissioner William Hamilton.

Geography
Hamilton Township covers an area of 25.3 square miles (65.53 square kilometers); of this, 0.14 square miles (0.35 square kilometers) or 0.53 percent is water. The streams of Kilgore Creek and Marks Branch run through this township.

Cities and towns
 Pleasanton

Adjacent townships
 Eden Township (north)
 Woodland Township (northeast)
 Morgan Township (east)
 New Buda Township (west)
 Burrell Township (northwest)

Cemeteries
The township contains seven cemeteries: Campbell, Chase (historical), Cowles, Dale, Gammill, Hamilton and New Salem.

References
 U.S. Board on Geographic Names (GNIS)
 United States Census Bureau cartographic boundary files

External links
 US-Counties.com
 City-Data.com

Townships in Decatur County, Iowa
Townships in Iowa